Charles Rudolph Walgreen Sr. (October 9, 1873 – December 11, 1939) was an American businessman who founded Walgreens.

Background
He was born in Dixon, Illinois, before moving to Galesburg, Illinois, at a young age. He was the son of Swedish immigrants.

In the 1790s, Charles's great-great-great-grandfather, Sven Olofsson, adopted the surname Wahlgren during his military service, a family fact passed down over the generations. When Charles's father, Carl Magnus Olofsson, came to America from Sweden, he decided to change the family name to Walgreen. When Charles was still quite young he and his family relocated to Dixon, Illinois, in 1887. He attended Dixon High School, Dixon Business College. He was a member of the international fraternity Tau Kappa Epsilon.

As a young adult, he lost part of a finger in an accident at a shoe factory. The doctor who treated him persuaded him to become an apprentice for a local druggist. His interest in pharmacy dated from the time he was employed by D.S. Horton, a druggist in Dixon where he was apprenticed as a pharmacist. In 1893, Walgreen went to Chicago and became a registered pharmacist. At the start of the Spanish–American War, Walgreen enlisted with the 1st Illinois Volunteer Cavalry. While serving in Cuba, he contracted malaria and yellow fever, which continued to plague him for the rest of his life.

Career
After his discharge, Walgreen returned to Chicago and worked as a pharmacist for Isaac Blood. In 1901, he opened a second store in 1909 and by 1916 owned nine drug stores, which he incorporated as Walgreen Co. Walgreens was one of the first chains to carry non-pharmaceuticals as a mainstay of the store's retail selection. Walgreens offered low-priced lunch counters, built its own ice cream factory, and introduced the malted milk shake in 1922. By 1927, Walgreen had established 110 stores.

His son Charles Rudolph Walgreen Jr. (March 4, 1906 – February 10, 2007) and grandson Charles R. Walgreen III both shared his name and played prominent roles in the company he founded. His daughter, Ruth Walgreen, married Justin Whitlock Dart, who left the Walgreens company after they divorced and went on to control the rival Rexall Drug Stores in 1943. Ruth, in her adult years a published poet, eventually remarried and began spending winters in Tucson, Arizona, where in the early 1960s, she was instrumental in establishing the Poetry Center at the University of Arizona.

He is a member of the Labor Hall of Fame.

References

Sources
Griffin, Marie. Industry 'Legends' Deserve Recognition (Drug Store News, October 9, 1995)
Ingham, John N. Biographical Dictionary of American Business Leaders (Westport, CT: Greenwood Press, 1983)
Van Doren, Charles, ed. Webster's American Biographies (Springfield, MA: G. & C. Merriam Co., 1979)

External links
Walgreens Official Website

1873 births
1939 deaths
People from Knoxville, Illinois
Military personnel from Illinois
Businesspeople from Illinois
American people of Swedish descent
American businesspeople in retailing
American pharmacists
American company founders
Walgreens people
Methodists from Illinois